Steinfurt III is an electoral constituency (German: Wahlkreis) represented in the Bundestag. It elects one member via first-past-the-post voting. Under the current constituency numbering system, it is designated as constituency 128. It is located in northern North Rhine-Westphalia, comprising the eastern part of the Steinfurt district.

Steinfurt III was created for the inaugural 1949 federal election. Since 2013, it has been represented by Anja Karliczek of the Christian Democratic Union (CDU).

Geography
Steinfurt III is located in northern North Rhine-Westphalia. As of the 2021 federal election, it comprises the municipalities of Emsdetten, Greven, Hörstel, Hopsten, Ibbenbüren, Ladbergen, Lengerich, Lienen, Lotte, Mettingen, Recke, Saerbeck, Tecklenburg, and Westerkappeln from the Steinfurt district.

History
Steinfurt III was created in 1949, then known as Steinfurt – Tecklenburg. From 1965 through 1976, it was named Tecklenburg. From 1980 through 1998, it was named Steinfurt II. It acquired its current name in the 2002 election. In the 1949 election, it was North Rhine-Westphalia constituency 36 in the numbering system. From 1953 through 1961, it was number 95. From 1965 through 1976, it was number 93. From 1980 through 1998, it was number 98. From 2002 through 2009, it was number 129. Since 2013, it has been number 128.

Originally, the constituency comprised the districts of Steinfurt and Tecklenburg. From 1965 through 1976, it was coterminous with the Tecklenburg district. In the 1980 through 1998 elections, it comprised the municipalities of Emsdetten, Greven, Hörstel, Hopsten, Ibbenbüren, Ladbergen, Lengerich, Lienen, Lotte, Mettingen, Recke, Rheine, Saerbeck, Tecklenburg, and Westerkappeln from the Steinfurt district. In the 2002 election, it lost the municipality of Rheine.

Members
The constituency was first represented by Georg Pelster of the Christian Democratic Union (CDU) from 1949 to 1961, followed by fellow CDU member Franz Falke for a single term. Wilhelm Rawe of the CDU was then representative from 1965 to 1980. Gottfried Köster was elected in 1980, and succeeded by Constantin Heereman von Zuydtwyck in 1983. Karl-Josef Laumann then served a single term from 1990 to 1994. Reinhold Hemker of the Social Democratic Party (SPD) was elected in 1994 and served until 2009, when Dieter Jasper of the CDU became representative. Anja Karliczek was elected in 2013, and re-elected in 2017 and 2021.

Election results

2021 election

2017 election

2013 election

2009 election

Notes

References

Federal electoral districts in North Rhine-Westphalia
1949 establishments in West Germany
Constituencies established in 1949
Steinfurt (district)